Hubert Daix (1889–1960) was a Belgian film actor.

Selected filmography
 Prince Jean (1928)
 Not So Stupid (1928)
 The Marriage of Mademoiselle Beulemans (1927)
 The Maelstrom of Paris (1928)
 The Ladies in the Green Hats (1929)
 Everybody Wins (1930)
 The Shark (1930)
 The Road to Paradise (1930)
 The Sweetness of Loving (1930)
 The Night at the Hotel (1932)
 Monsieur Albert (1932)
 The Beautiful Sailor (1932)
 Tossing Ship (1932)
 The Marriage of Mademoiselle Beulemans (1950)

References

Bibliography
 Goble, Alan. The Complete Index to Literary Sources in Film. Walter de Gruyter, 1999.

External links

1889 births
1960 deaths
Belgian male film actors
Belgian male silent film actors
20th-century Belgian male actors
Male actors from Brussels